Player of the Season may refer to:

In English football
Premier League Player of the Season
Luton Town F.C. Player of the Season
Norwich City F.C. Player of the Season
Reading F.C. Player of the Season
Southampton F.C. Player of the Season
Watford F.C. Player of the Season
Stoke City F.C. Player of the Year

Other uses
PSL Player of the Season
PSL Players' Player of the Season

See also
Player of the Year